Parasitiformes are a superorder of Arachnids, constituting one of the two major groups of mites, alongside Acariformes. Parasitiformes has, at times, been classified at the rank of order or suborder.

It is uncertain whether Parasitiformes and Acariformes are closely related, and in many analyses they are recovered more closely related to other arachnids. Amongst the best known members of the group are the ticks, though the Mesostigmata is by far the most diverse group with over 8,000 described species, including economically important species such as the varroa mite.

Description

Taxonomy 

 Holothyrida - small group of scavenging mites native to former Gondwana landmasses
 Ixodida – ticks
 Mesostigmata – a large order of predatory and parasitic mites
 Opilioacarida – a small group of large, long-legged segmented mites.
Many species are parasitic (most famous of which are ticks), but not all. For example, about half of the 10,000 known species in the suborder Mesostigmata are predatory and cryptozoan, living in soil-litter, rotting wood, dung, carrion, nests or house dust. A few species have switched to grazing on fungi or ingesting spores or pollen. Phylogenetic relationships of the groups, after Klompen, 2010:

The phytoseiid mites, which account for about 15% of all described Mesostigmata are used with great success for biological control.

There are over 12,000 described species of Parasitiformes, and the total estimate is between 100,000 and 200,000 species.

Gallery

Evolutionary history 
The oldest known fossils of Parasitiformes, representing three out of the four modern groups, Ixodida, Mesostigmata, and Opilioacarida, are known from Cretaceous aged amber, dating to around 100 million years ago. They are suspected to have diversified substantially earlier. The genetic divergence between the groups is less than that of Acariform mites, suggesting a younger origin, likely dating to the late Paleozoic.

References

 
Arachnid orders